The Guianan warbling antbird (Hypocnemis cantator) is an insectivorous bird in the antbird family, Thamnophilidae. It is found at lower levels in humid forest in the Guianas, far eastern Venezuela (with Guyana), and north-eastern Brazil (north of the Amazon River and east of the lower Negro River and the Branco River).

Taxonomy
The French polymath Georges-Louis Leclerc, Comte de Buffon described the Guianan warbling antbird in his Histoire Naturelle des Oiseaux in 1779. The bird was also illustrated in a hand-coloured plate engraved by François-Nicolas Martinet in the Planches Enluminées D'Histoire Naturelle which was produced under the supervision of Edme-Louis Daubenton to accompany Buffon's text. Buffon did not include a scientific name with his description but in 1783 the Dutch naturalist Pieter Boddaert coined the binomial name Formicarius cantatar in his catalogue of the Planches Enluminées. The specific name is from the Latin cantator "a singer". The present genus Hypocnemis was introduced by the German ornithologist Jean Cabanis in 1847.

The Imeri, Peruvian, yellow-breasted, Rondonia and Spix's warbling antbird were all formerly treated as subspecies of the Guianan warbling antbird. A study published in 2007 found that there were significant vocal differences as well a small plumage differences between the taxa and they are now all treated as separate species. As presently defined, the Guianan warbling antbird is monotypic, although the subspecies notaea sometimes has been recognized.

Its conservation status has been assessed as near threatened.

References

Further reading

 Zimmer & Isler. 2003. Hypocnemis cantator (Warbling Antbird). Pp. 645 in del Hoyo, Elliott, & Christie. 2003. Handbook of the Birds of the World. Vol. 8. Broadbills to Tapaculos. Lynx Edicions. Barcelona.

External links

Xeno-canto: audio recordings of the Guianan warbling antbird

Guianan warbling antbird
Birds of the Guianas
Guianan warbling antbird